Waterloo is a small suburb in Wishaw, North Lanarkshire, Scotland.
It is located on the A71 Edinburgh-Irvine road. Originally a village in its own right, it is now considered to be a suburb of Wishaw.

It does not have many local services of note, however, it is home to the Indian Restaurant, The Pink Turban.

Location

References

Areas of Wishaw